Vīraṉ is a Tamil word வீரன்.

Vīraṉ means :

1. A man who has heroic qualities or has performed a heroic act and is regarded as a model or ideal among others.

2. A man who has served as a warrior or commander in a military force or during a war.

3. A man who is a dancer.

Virån is a river in Sweden.

References

Rivers of Kalmar County